Let Me Know You is the eighth studio album by American bassist and record producer Stanley Clarke. It was released on April 13, 1982 through Epic Records. Recording sessions for the album took place at Larrabee Sound Studios in Los Angeles, California. The album features contributions from various musicians, including Darlene Love, David Lasley and Marcy Levy on backing vocals, Denzil "Broadway" Miller, Greg Phillinganes and Todd Cochran on keyboards, Michael Sembello and Carlos Santana on guitars, Paulinho da Costa on percussion, Leon "Ndugu" Chancler, Rick Shlosser, Steve Ferrone, Gordon Peeke and Roger Linn on drums.

The album peaked at number 114 on the US Billboard 200 and at number 25 on the Top R&B/Hip-Hop Albums chart.

Track listing

Personnel 
 Stanley Clarke – vocals (tracks: 1, 3-5, 7-8), bass (tracks: 1, 3, 5-8), piccolo bass (tracks: 1, 5, 7, 8), tenor bass (track 2), electric bass (tracks: 2, 4), solo bass (track 4), electric bass solo (track 7), guitar (tracks: 1, 3, 7, 8), sitar (track 3), Roland bass synthesizer (track 8), producer

 Darlene Love – backing vocals (tracks: 3, 5, 8)
 David Lasley – backing vocals (tracks: 3, 5, 8)
 Marcy Levy – backing vocals (tracks: 3, 5, 8)
 June Christopher – lyrics (track 3)
 Denzil A. Miller Jr. – acoustic piano (tracks: 1, 3, 5, 8), Fender Rhodes electric piano (track 3), Moog synthesizer (track 4), minimoog (track 8)
 Greg Phillinganes – Fender Rhodes electric piano (tracks: 2, 4), minimoog (track 7)
 Todd Cochran – Fender Rhodes electric piano (track 7)
 Michael Sembello – guitar (tracks: 2, 4, 5)
 Carlos Santana – guitar solo (tracks: 1, 4)
 Roger Linn – drums (track 1)
 Gordon Peeke – drums (track 1)
 Paulinho da Costa – drums (track 1), percussion (tracks: 2-3, 6-8)
 Rick Shlosser – drums (tracks: 2, 4)
 Steve Ferrone – drums (tracks: 3, 8)
 Leon "Ndugu" Chancler – drums (tracks: 5-7)
 Steve Forman – percussion (track 4)
 Steven Lederman – additional vocals effects (track 8)
 Armand Kaproff – cello (tracks: 2, 3, 5, 8)
 Douglas L. Davis – cello (tracks: 2, 3, 5, 8)
 Earl S. Madison – cello (tracks: 2, 3, 5, 8)
 Paula Hochhalter – cello (tracks: 2, 3, 5)
 Dorothy Remsen – harp (tracks: 2, 3, 5, 8)
 Charles C. Loper – trombone (tracks: 3, 5, 8)
 Dick Hyde – trombone (tracks: 3, 5, 8)
 George Bohanon – trombone (tracks: 3, 5, 8)
 Lewis Melvin McCreary – trombone (tracks: 3, 5, 8)
 Chuck Findley – trumpet (tracks: 3, 5, 8)
 Gary E. Grant – trumpet (tracks: 3, 5, 8)
 Jerry Hey – trumpet (tracks: 3, 5, 8)
 Larry G. Hall – trumpet (tracks: 3, 5, 8)
 Allan Harshman – viola (tracks: 2, 3, 5, 8)
 Janet Lakatos – viola (tracks: 2, 3, 5, 8)
 Joel Soultanian – viola (tracks: 2, 3, 5, 8)
 Roland Kato – viola (tracks: 2, 3, 5, 8)
 Rollice E. Dale – viola (tracks: 2, 3, 5, 8)
 Samuel Boghossian – viola (tracks: 2, 3, 5, 8)
 Alfred C. Brewning – violin (tracks: 2, 3, 5, 8)
 Charles Veal Jr. – violin (tracks: 2, 3, 5, 8)
 Daniel Shindaryov – violin (tracks: 2, 3, 5, 8)
 Endre Granat – violin (tracks: 2, 3, 5, 8)
 Gordon Howard Marron – violin (tracks: 2, 3, 5, 8)
 Harry Bluestone – violin (tracks: 2, 3, 5, 8)
 Ilkka Talvi – violin (tracks: 2, 3, 5, 8)
 Joy Lyle – violin (tracks: 2, 3, 5, 8)
 Nathan Kaproff – violin (tracks: 2, 3, 5, 8)
 Nathan Ross – violin (tracks: 2, 3, 5, 8)
 Paul Shure – violin (tracks: 2, 3, 5, 8)
 Tibor Zelig – violin (tracks: 2, 3, 5, 8)
 Vicky Sylvester – violin (tracks: 2, 3, 5, 8)
 Don Menza – woodwind (tracks: 3, 5, 8) 
 Ernie Watts – woodwind (tracks: 3, 5, 8)
 Gary Lee Herbig – woodwind (tracks: 3, 5, 8)
 Jim Horn – woodwind (tracks: 3, 5, 8)
Technical
 Erik Zobler – mixing & recording
 Danny Kopelson – assistant mixing engineer
 Wally Buck – assistant mixing engineer
 Judy Clapp – assistant recording engineer
 Nyya Lark – assistant recording engineer
 Sabrina Buchanek – assistant recording engineer
 George Horn – mastering
 Bob Seidemann – photography

Chart history

References

External links 

Let Me Know You by Stanley Clarke on iTunes

1982 albums
Stanley Clarke albums
Epic Records albums
Albums produced by Stanley Clarke